Sandwich Bay may refer to:

 Sandwich Bay, Kent, England
 Sandwich Bay (Newfoundland and Labrador), Canada